Marriage Announcement is a 1926 German silent film directed by Fritz Kaufmann and starring Fritz Kampers, Max Landa, and Hermann Picha.

Cast
In alphabetical order

References

Bibliography

External links

1926 films
Films of the Weimar Republic
German silent feature films
Films directed by Fritz Kaufmann
German black-and-white films